The National Association of Women Lawyers is a voluntary organization founded in 1899 and based in the United States. Its aim is to promote women lawyers and women's legal rights.

History 
The group was originally called the "Women Lawyers' Club", and was founded  by 18 female lawyers in New York City in 1899.Club Women of New York, p. 116 (1914) The organization started publishing the Women Lawyers' Journal in 1911.  The group was renamed the "Women Lawyers Association" by 1914, and changed to its current name in 1923.History, National Association of Women Lawyers. Records of the National Association of Women Lawyers, 1913-1999: A Finding Aid, Harvard University Library (2013)

Notable Members 
Rosalind Goodrich Bates of Los Angeles
Oda Faulconer, The Women Lawyers Association of Los Angeles was born by the merging of two women's bar organizations: the Women Lawyers' Club, founded in 1918, and the Women Lawyers' Association of Southern California, founded in 1928. The president of the Women Lawyers' Association of Southern California was Mab Copeland Lineman, who was also the 4th President of the Women Lawyers' Club, while Faulconer was the secretary-treasurer. In 1930, when the Association reorganized into the Southern California Council of the National Association of Women Lawyers, Ida May Adams was president and Faulconer vice-president. Faulconer was elected president for two terms, in 1938 and 1939
Kate Pier, vice-president for Wisconsin of the National Association of Women Lawyers. 
Lavinia Marian Fleming Poe, first African American woman lawyer in Virginia, passing the bar exam in 1925. 
F. Josephine Stevenson, served one year as president of the Women Lawyers' Club, and four years as corresponding secretary
Ida V. Wells, director of the Women Lawyers' Association.
Olive Stott Gabriel, president in the 1930s.
Rose Zetzer, first woman admitted to the Maryland State Bar Association

See also
 National Association of Muslim Lawyers
 National LGBTQ+ Bar Association
 National Negro Bar Association

References

External links 
 Official website

Organizations established in 1899
American bar associations
Professional associations for women